Plymouth Municipal Airport  is a county-owned, public-use airport located two nautical miles (3.7 km) south of the central business district of Plymouth, in Washington County, North Carolina, United States.  According to the FAA's National Plan of Integrated Airport Systems for 2009–2013, it is classified as a general aviation airport.

Although many U.S. airports use the same three-letter location identifier for the FAA and IATA, this airport is assigned PMZ by the FAA but has no designation from the IATA (which assigned PMZ to Palmar Sur Airport in Palmar Sur, Costa Rica).

Facilities and aircraft 
It has one runway designated 3/21 with an asphalt surface measuring 5,500 by 75 feet (1,676 x 23 m).

For the 12-month period ending November 21, 2008, the airport had 11,275 aircraft operations, an average of 30 per day: 80% general aviation, 18% military, and 2% air taxi. At that time there were 13 aircraft based at this airport: 77% single-engine, 15% multi-engine and 8% helicopter.

References

External links 
 Aerial photo as of 6 March 1994 from USGS The National Map
  at North Carolina DOT Airport Directory
 
 

Airports in North Carolina
Buildings and structures in Washington County, North Carolina
Transportation in Washington County, North Carolina